United States v. Kahriger, 345 U.S. 22 (1953), was a United States Supreme Court ruling that held certain provisions of the Revenue Act of 1951 were constitutional, in particular sections related to an occupational tax on persons involved in gambling.

The Supreme Court ruled that the Congressional purpose of penalizing intrastate gambling under the guise of imposing a tax did not violate the Constitution by infringing the police power reserved to the states. The Court stated: "Unless there are [penalty] provisions extraneous to any tax need, courts are without authority to limit the exercise of the taxing power."

The Supreme Court also ruled that the 1951 Revenue Act did not violate the Fifth Amendment privilege against self-incrimination. However, this holding was later overruled by the Court in Marchetti v. United States.

Notes

Further reading
.
.

External links
 

United States Supreme Court cases
United States Supreme Court cases of the Vinson Court
United States taxation and revenue case law
1953 in United States case law